Hasanabad (also Romanized as Hasanābād; also known as Ḩasanābād-e Tāzeh Kand, Tāzeh Kand, Tāzeh Kand-e Ḩasanābād, and Tazekhkend) is a village in Zanjanrud-e Pain Rural District, Zanjanrud District, Zanjan County, Zanjan Province, Iran. At the 2006 census, its population was 79, in 16 families.

References 

Populated places in Zanjan County